This is a list in progress of world-famous or important Aromanians and people having Aromanian ancestry.

Arts

 Constantin Belimace (1848–1932), Romanian poet, born in Bitola
 Hristu Cândroveanu (1928–2013), Romanian editor, literary critic and writer
 Jovan Četirević Grabovan (1720–1790), Serbian Orthodox icon painter
 Jovan Jovanović Zmaj (1833–1904), Serbian poet
 Konstantin Čomu (1865–1952), pioneer of the cinema
 Stere Gulea (born 1943), Romanian filmmaker, Greek-Aromanian parentage
 Yanaki and Milton Manaki (1878–1954; 1882–1964), photography and cinema pioneers, born in Avdella
 Branislav Nušić (1864–1938), Serbian novelist and playwright, Greek-Aromanian father
 Jovan Sterija Popović, Serbian writer, father of Greek-Aromanian descent
 Constantin Noica (1909–1987), Romanian philosopher, essayist and poet
 Nushi Tulliu (1872–1941), Romanian poet and novelist, born in Avdella
 Camil Ressu (1880–1962), Romanian painter
 Florica Prevenda, Romanian painter
 Alexandru Arsinel, Romanian actor and comedian
 Toma Caragiu (born 1925), Romanian actor, born in Argos Orestiko
 Toma Enache (born 1970), Romanian film director
 Taško Načić (1934–1993), Serbian actor, paternal Aromanian descent
 Dan Pița, Romanian filmmaker
 Sandër Prosi (1920–1985), Albanian actor
 Sergiu Nicolaescu (1930–2013), Romanian filmmaker and politician, Aromanian family
 Ion Luca Caragiale, Romanian writer, poet, theater manager, political commentator and journalist
 Elena Gheorghe, Romanian singer
 Toše Proeski, Macedonian pop singer-songwriter, family from Kruševo
 Ştefan Octavian Iosif, Romanian author
 Kira Hagi, Romanian actress

Law, philanthropy and commerce

 George Averoff (1818–1899), Greek businessman and philanthropist, born in Metsovo.
 Georgios Sinas (1783–1856), Habsburg-Greek entrepreneur, banker and philanthropist, born in Moscopole. Father of philanthropist Simon Sinas (1810–1876). Possibly Greek-Aromanian.
 Emanoil Gojdu (1802–1870), Austrian-Romanian lawyer and philanthropist. Moscopole family.
 Mocioni family (19th c.), banking and philanthropist family in Austria-Hungary
 Petar Ičko (c. 1755–1808), merchant, Ottoman and later Serbian diplomat, born in Pyrgoi. Possibly Aromanian.
 Sterjo Nakov (born 1948), businessman

Clergy

 Joachim III of Constantinople (1834–1912), Patriarch (1878–1884, 1901–1912), family from Kruševo
 Theodore Kavalliotis (1718–1789), Greek Orthodox priest, teacher and Englightener.
 Andrei Șaguna (1809–1873), Romanian Orthodox bishop and Romanian nationalist, family from Grabovë
Damian of Albania, Albanian Orthodox Archbishop from 1966-1967

Statesmen

 Evangelos Averoff, Greek minister and leader of the New Democracy party
 Nicolae Constantin Batzaria (1874–1952), Aromanian cultural activist, Ottoman statesman and Romanian writer.
 Costică Canacheu, Romanian politician, deputy in the Romanian Parliament, secretary of the Democratic Party
 Ion Caramitru, Romanian politician, former Minister of Culture
 Alcibiades Diamandi, political figure of Greece, one member of the committee who sent letters asking for an autonomous Vlach statelet in 1917 under Italian protection (later called Principality of Pindus) and during the Second World War leader of the Roman Legion, an organization who helped the Italian army during the occupation of Greece
 Michael Dukakis, American Governor of Massachusetts and former presidential candidate. Greek-Aromanian mother.
 Taki Fiti (born 1950), R. Macedonian economist and former state financial minister
 Ioannis Kolettis, Greek Prime Minister, declared independence from the Ottoman Empire
 Apostol Mărgărit, leader of the pro-Romanian faction of the Aromanians of Greece, inspector of the Romanian schools and member of the Romanian Academy in Bucharest
 Nicolaos Matussis, politician and lawyer, leader of the collaborationist Roman Legion
 Filip Mișea (1873–1944), Aromanian activist, physician and politician
 Rita Marko, Albanian communist politician.

Sciences, academia and engineering

 Dimitri Atanasescu, Ottoman-born Aromanian who founded the first Romanian school in the Balkans in Trnovo in 1864
 Mihail G. Boiagi, Austrian-born Aromanian grammarian and professor
 Elie Carafoli, Romanian-educated, born in Greece, aerodynamics innovator, university teacher
 Mihail Dimonie, Aromanian botanist and teacher
 Nicolae Ianovici, Aromanian linguist
 Jovan Karamata (1902–1967), Serbian mathematician, paternal Greek-Aromanian descent
 Mina Minovici, Romanian forensic scientist; director of the first Romanian Institute of Legal Medicine; founder of the modern medico-legal system
 Ioan Nicolidi of Pindus (1737–1828), Aromanian physician and noble in Austria
 Sterie Diamandi, Romanian biographer and essayist
 Neagu Djuvara, Romanian diplomat and historian
 George Murnu, Romanian historian
 Daniel Moscopolites, Aromanian philologist, author of a famous lexicon
 Gheorghe Peltecu, doctor, professor, MD and manager of the Filantropia Hospital - Bucharest, a center of excellence for obstetrics and gynecology.
 Nicolae Saramandu, Romanian linguist and philologist
 Constantin Ucuta, Aromanian academic and protopope in Prussia
 Matilda Caragiu Marioțeanu, Aromanian academic, member of the Romanian Academy

Sports

 Gigi Becali, politician; owner of the Steaua București football club
 Cristian Gațu, Romanian handball player
 Gabriel Torje
 Gheorghe Hagi, Romanian football player
 Ianis Hagi, Romanian football player
 Simona Halep, Romanian tennis player
 Dominique Moceanu, Romanian-American gymnast

Military
 Konda Bimbaša (ca. 1770–1813), Serbian revolutionary, born in Epirus. Possibly Aromanian.
 Pitu Guli (1865–1903), Internal Macedonian Revolutionary Organization commander, born in Kruševo.
 Mitre the Vlach (1873–1907), IMRO commander, born in Makrochori.

References

 
Lists of people by ethnicity